Golden Sky or Golden Skies may refer to:

Music
Golden Sky (The Holidays EP), 2010
Golden Sky (The Teenage Kissers EP), 2016
Golden Sky, an album by Smile.dk, 2002
"Golden Sky", a song by God Is an Astronaut from Age of the Fifth Sun, 2010
Golden Skies, an album by Mono/Poly, 2014
"Golden Skies", a song by Segression, recording as Side Effect X

Other uses
Golden Sky, a 2009 art exhibition by Yu Hong
Golden Sky, a Thoroughbred racehorse, winner of the 1908 Prix Jean-Luc Lagardère
Golden Skies, a 1992 publication by Gérard Coste